Six Flags Fiesta Texas consists of six themed areas and an adjacent water park, White Water Bay.

DC Universe

Los Festivales
Los Festivales is lined with shops selling Six Flags and Fiesta Texas merchandise and food and is the themed land when guest first entered the park.

 Zaragoza Theatre, a 1992 indoor theater.
 Teatro Fiesta, a 1992 outdoor venue.

Crackaxle Canyon Steampunk District
Crackaxle Canyon is themed to a 1920s boomtown which features several themed rides and shops.

 Lone Star Lil's Amphitheater, a 1992 outdoor Amphitheater features events and concerts.
 Whistle Stop 39, a station for the 1992 train ride that takes around the park, Fiesta Texas Railroad.

Thrill Seeker Park

Spassburg
Spassburg is themed to a German village after the large amounts of German towns in Texas.

 Der Pilger Bahnhof, a station for the 1992 train ride that takes around the park, Fiesta Texas Railroad.
 Pirate Ship Play Zone, a 2009 Interactive Kiddie Playship. Known as S.S. Feathersword's Playship from 2009 to 2010. The ride was then called Splish Splash Zone from 2011 to 2019.
 Sangerfest Halle, a 1992 indoor theatre and food court.
 Wiggles Theatre, a 2009 outdoor theatre. No official name or show has replaced the name of the theatre and the former show, Get Ready To Wiggle since the removal of The Wiggles.

Rockville
Rockville is themed to a fictional town in 1950s.

 Rockville High, a 1992 indoor theatre themed to a high school. For Fright Fest, the theatre is used as a haunted maze called RockKill High School.

Fiesta Bay Boardwalk

Future attractions 

 Kid Flash Cosmic Coaster - Dual-tracked family single-rail roller coaster manufactured by Skyline Attractions slated to open in 2023.

Former attractions

Roller coasters

Other attractions and rides

References

External links

 Six Flags Fiesta Texas official website
 Six Flags Fiesta Texas Source

Amusement rides lists
Six Flags Fiesta Texas attractions